WWY may refer to:

 West Wyalong Airport, with an IATA code of WWY
 Wefri Warsay Yika'alo, a war recovery project in Eritrea
 Queen's Own Warwickshire and Worcestershire Yeomanry (QOWWY or WWY), a British regiment
 Wong Wai Yin (born 1981), a Hong Kong artist
 The licence code for Wyszków County

See also

 WY (disambiguation)